Dudley Railway Station was a railway station in Dudley, West Midlands, England, built where the Oxford-Worcester-Wolverhampton Line and the South Staffordshire Line diverged to Wolverhampton and Walsall and Lichfield respectively.

History
The station was built as a collaboration between the Oxford, Worcester and Wolverhampton Railway (which was soon to fall into the hands of the Great Western Railway, and the London and North Western Railway (which had taken control of the South Staffordshire Railway – the company that had constructed the line from Lichfield, via Walsall, to Dudley). The latter eventually became part of the London, Midland and Scottish Railway. The station was completed in 1860.

A racecourse had been situated just north of the station until the mid-1840s when it was closed to make way for the railway, but its name was revived during the 1980s when Racecourse Colliery, a model colliery, was opened on the site as part of the Black Country Living Museum.

The line had reasonable passenger usage until about the early 1880s, when it began to slump at several stations, leading to the line becoming a largely freight only operation in 1887. It would remain open for goods traffic, which was considerable at this time, as the district had become highly industrialised in the then heyday of the Black Country's industrial past.

As the local industry declined and road transport became more common, the station entered a post-World War 2 decline, although not as heavily as most others on the line.

Closure
The station was popular with local people who appreciated its convenient location and frequent trains, with high numbers of passengers still using the services as recently as the 1950s. The OW&WR line from Stourbridge Junction to Wolverhampton Low Level closed to passengers in 1962,although a small number of Sunday trains non-stop between Wolverhampton and Worcester continued to use the line until March 1967, while Dudley remained as a terminus for trains from Walsall on the South Staffordshire Line, Old Hill on the Bumble Hole Line and Birmingham Snow Hill until the Beeching Axe had its effect in 1964 despite the station's high passenger turnover at the time.

Closure and future development
The buildings of Dudley Station remained open for parcels until early 1967, when they were knocked down and replaced by Dudley Freightliner Terminal. It was one of the first of its kind in Britain.

The Freightliner Terminal closed in 1989, and the line passing through Dudley closed to all traffic in 1993. Over the next 23 years, the railway and former station and freightliner terminal sites became increasingly overgrown with vegetation, although this was cleared in early 2017 to make way for the planned re-opening of the line to the Midland Metro and goods trains.

Since 1986, there have been plans to redevelop the station to become part of the local West Midlands Metro tram network, with the line reopening between Wednesbury, Dudley Port, Dudley, and the Merry Hill Shopping Centre, with trams on one track and freight on the other. After 30 years of delays and difficulties in securing funding, the scheme got the go-ahead from the government in the autumn of 2016, with clearance of vegetation and the remaining track getting underway early in 2017 and full scale work would begin around two years later, with the line being open by 2023.

Historic imagery of the site

References

Further reading

External links
Rail Around Birmingham and the West Midlands: Dudley railway station

Disused railway stations in Dudley
Railway stations in Great Britain opened in 1850
Railway stations in Great Britain closed in 1964
Beeching closures in England
Former Great Western Railway stations